Sekou Oumar Yansané (born 28 April 2003) is a French professional footballer who plays as a forward for Qatar Stars League club Al Ahli.

Club career 
Yansané began his career at his hometown club of Grenoble before signing for Lyon. He continued his career at Dijon, where he played three matches and scored two goals for the reserve side in the Championnat National 3, before signing for Paris Saint-Germain (PSG) on 8 January 2021. He joined the club for a reported transfer fee of €600,000, signed a contract until June 2023, and was assigned to the club's under-19 side. On 22 December 2021, Yansané made his debut for PSG in a 1–1 Ligue 1 draw away to Lorient. In the 2021–22 season with the PSG under-19s, he scored 21 goals in 23 league games, and was the top scorer of the Championnat National U19.

On 10 September 2022, Yansané signed for Qatar Stars League club Al Ahli. Ten days later, he was loaned out to fellow Qatari club Al-Rayyan until the end of 2022. Upon his return to Al Ahli, Yansané made his debut in the Qatar Stars League on 5 January 2023, coming on as a substitute in a 2–1 home defeat to Al-Arabi. On 12 January, he scored his first goal for Al Ahli in a 2–1 away victory over Al-Sailiya.

International career 
Born in France, Yansané is of Guinean descent through his father and Moroccan descent through his mother. He has been approached by Guinea to play for the senior national team, and by Morocco to play for the under-20 national team.

Career statistics

Honours 
Paris Saint-Germain

 Ligue 1: 2021–22

References

External links 
 

2003 births
Living people
Sportspeople from Grenoble
Footballers from Auvergne-Rhône-Alpes
French sportspeople of Guinean descent
French sportspeople of Moroccan descent
Black French sportspeople
French footballers
Association football forwards
Grenoble Foot 38 players
Olympique Lyonnais players
Dijon FCO players
Paris Saint-Germain F.C. players
Al Ahli SC (Doha) players
Al-Rayyan SC players
Championnat National 3 players
Ligue 1 players
Qatar Stars League players
French expatriate footballers
French expatriate sportspeople in Qatar
Expatriate footballers in Qatar